Atanas Krastev (born 1 February 1993) is a Bulgarian footballer who plays as a defender.

Career
On 21 June 2017 he joined Third League club Arda Kardzhali.

References

External links 
 
 
 Profile at Sportal

1993 births
Living people
Bulgarian footballers
FC Haskovo players
FC Botev Galabovo players
FC Arda Kardzhali players
FC Sportist Svoge players
SFC Etar Veliko Tarnovo players
First Professional Football League (Bulgaria) players
Association football defenders
People from Haskovo
Sportspeople from Haskovo Province